Orlando Santamaría (29 May 1920 – 9 September 1992) was a Cuban sports shooter. He competed in the 50 m rifle event at the 1948 Summer Olympics.

References

1920 births
1992 deaths
Cuban male sport shooters
Olympic shooters of Cuba
Shooters at the 1948 Summer Olympics
Place of birth missing
Cuban emigrants to the United States